National Highway 229 (NH 229) is an Indian National Highway located entirely within the state of Arunachal Pradesh. It originates at Tawang in the western corner of the state, runs mostly eastwards for 1090 km and terminates at NH 52 in Pasighat.

Route 
 Tawang
Bomdila
Seppa
Ziro
Daporijo
Along
Pasighat

See also
 List of National Highways in India (by Highway Number)
 List of National Highways in India

References

External links
Trans Arunachal Highway

229
National highways in India (old numbering)
Pasighat